Derek John Plante (born January 17, 1971) is an American ice hockey coach and former professional ice hockey player. Plante played eight seasons in the National Hockey League (NHL) for the Buffalo Sabres, Dallas Stars, Chicago Blackhawks and Philadelphia Flyers. He was a member of the 1999 Stanley Cup champion Dallas Stars. He was an assistant coach at the University of Minnesota-Duluth from 2010-2015 before returning to the program as Associate Head Coach in 2020, a position he holds to this day.

Playing career
Drafted out of high school by the Buffalo Sabres in 1989, Plante attended the University of Minnesota Duluth and by his senior year was an All-Star leading the WCHA in goals, assists, and total scoring. Plante skipped minor league hockey and jumped right to the NHL in 1994, replacing an injured Pat LaFontaine and scoring 21 goals. By turning pro so quickly, Plante missed out on an opportunity to represent the United States in the 1994 Winter Olympics.

In the lockout-shortened 1994–95 season, Plante managed only 3 goals and 19 assists, but rebounded nicely in 1995–96 on a rebuilding, but hard-working Sabres squad, netting 23 goals and adding 30 assists. In 1997, Plante became the Sabres' top scoring center. he netted a career high 27 goals and led the surprising Sabres squad to a Northeast Division championship and playoff berth. Plante scored the game winning, series-clinching game 7 overtime goal against the upstart Ottawa Senators. Plante knocked down an opponent pass at center, quickly positioned himself, and fired a slapshot that managed to escape the glove of netminder Ron Tugnutt and trickle into the goal. Mobbed by his ecstatic teammates, Plante suffered a cut lip in the ensuing celebration. Plante played well in the next series vs. Eric Lindros and the Philadelphia Flyers, but the overmatched team fell in 5.

Plante's numbers slipped in 1997–98, scoring only 13 goals and 34 points, however the Sabres advanced deeper into the playoffs than many expected, losing to the Washington Capitals in the Eastern Conference Finals.

Halfway through the 1999 season Plante was traded to the Dallas Stars. The Stars went all the way to the Stanley Cup finals and met Plante's old team, the Sabres. Plante had played in the first two series of the playoffs, scoring a critical goal in the second round, but was a healthy scratch for every game of the finals, which the Stars won 4 games to 2. Even though he didn't play in the finals, Plante got in on the time-honored tradition of taking personal stewardship of the Cup, which he spent in his home town of Cloquet, Minnesota. The Dallas Stars had Plante's name engraved on the Stanley Cup even though he did not play in the required number of games.

The following year Plante found himself in the Chicago Blackhawks organization. For the first time in his career, Plante played on a minor league team, the Chicago Wolves.

In 2000–01 Plante starred for the AHL Philadelphia Phantoms, and by the end of the year was called up to join the Philadelphia Flyers. The Flyers kept Derek on their playoff roster to face the Sabres. Plante scored a goal against his former teammate Dominik Hašek earlier in the season, but the Sabres prevailed, and Plante hasn't been back in the NHL since.

Plante later went on to play in European leagues, most notably with the Munich Barons. From 2005 to 2007, he played in the Asian Hockey League as a member of the Nippon Paper Cranes, winning the championship in 2007. During 2007–2008, he played for the SC Langenthal.

Coaching career

University of Minnesota Duluth (2010–2015, 2020–Present)
He was hired on June 9, 2010 as a Minnesota Duluth assistant men's hockey coach. In June 2015, he announced he was resigning from his assistant coaching position with UMD.  On July 17, 2020 it was announced that he would return to Minnesota Duluth, as associate men’s hockey coach.

Career statistics

Regular season and playoffs

International

Awards and honors

References

External links
 

1971 births
Living people
Adler Mannheim players
American men's ice hockey centers
Buffalo Sabres draft picks
Buffalo Sabres players
Chicago Blackhawks players
Chicago Wolves (IHL) players
Dallas Stars players
Kalamazoo Wings (1974–2000) players
Minnesota Duluth Bulldogs men's ice hockey players
München Barons players
Nippon Paper Cranes players
People from Cloquet, Minnesota
Philadelphia Flyers players
Philadelphia Phantoms players
SC Langenthal players
Stanley Cup champions
ZSC Lions players
Ice hockey coaches from Minnesota
Minnesota Duluth Bulldogs men's ice hockey coaches
AHCA Division I men's ice hockey All-Americans
Ice hockey players from Minnesota
American expatriate ice hockey players in Germany
American expatriate ice hockey players in Japan
American expatriate ice hockey players in Switzerland